Paul Forell (14 January 1892 – 3 August 1959) was a German international footballer.

References

External links
 

1892 births
1959 deaths
Association football midfielders
German footballers
Germany international footballers